Atoconeura eudoxia is a species of dragonfly in the family Libellulidae. It is native to Kenya and Uganda. It may also occur in adjacent nations. It lives in rainforests, occupying streamside habitat.

References

Libellulidae
Insects of Kenya
Insects of Uganda
Insects described in 1908
Taxa named by William Forsell Kirby
Taxonomy articles created by Polbot